William Robert Patrick (17 June 1885 – 14 August 1946) was a New Zealand cricketer. He played first-class cricket for Canterbury and Otago between 1905 and 1927.

See also
 List of Otago representative cricketers

References

External links
 

1885 births
1946 deaths
New Zealand cricketers
Pre-1930 New Zealand representative cricketers
Canterbury cricketers
Otago cricketers
Cricketers from Christchurch
South Island cricketers